The 2017–18 Iona Gaels men's basketball team represented Iona College during the 2017–18 NCAA Division I men's basketball season. The Gaels, led by eighth-year head coach Tim Cluess, played their home games at the Hynes Athletic Center in New Rochelle, New York as members of the Metro Atlantic Athletic Conference. They finished the season 20–14, 11–7 in MAAC play to finish in fourth place. As the No. 4 seed in the 2018 MAAC tournament, they defeated Manhattan, Saint Peter's and Fairfield 83–71, to become champions of the MAAC Tournament for the third consecutive time. They earned the MAAC's automatic bid to the NCAA tournament, where they lost in the first round to Duke, 67–89.

Previous season 
The Gaels finished the 2016–17 season 22–13, 12–8 in MAAC play to finish in a tie for third place. In the 2017 MAAC tournament, they defeated Rider, Saint Peter's, and Siena win the tournament championship for the second season in a row. As a result, they received the MAAC's automatic bid to the 2017 NCAA tournament as the No. 14 seed in the Midwest region. There, they lost in the first round to Oregon, 77–93.

Roster

Schedule and results

|-
!colspan=9 style=|Non-conference regular season

|-
!colspan=9 style=|MAAC regular season

|-
!colspan=9 style=|MAAC tournament

|-
!colspan=9 style=|NCAA tournament

References

Iona Gaels men's basketball seasons
Iona
Iona